Malangas, officially the Municipality of Malangas (Cebuano: Lungsod sa Malangas; Filipino (Tagalog): Bayan ng Malangas; Zamboangueño/Chavacano: Municipio de Malangas), is a 3rd class municipality in the province of Zamboanga Sibugay, Philippines. According to the 2020 census, it has a population of 32,022 people.

The municipality is generally rolling near the shorelines and mountainous in the hinterland with some patches of flat land located within the mangroves near the shorelines. It borders Buug to the north-east; Diplahan to the north-west; Imelda to the west; Margosatubig, Zamboanga del Sur, to the east; and Alicia to the south.

Malangas is the site of coal mining in Western Mindanao area, operated by the Philippine National Oil Company - Exploration Corporation. The coalmine is one of the largest in the country. Its town center nests in a harbor in Dumanquilas Bay, boasts of its twin ports, one for coal, the other for passengers.

Malangas, unfortunately is infested with drug pushers and drug addicts for many years now. It has been dubbed as "Little Ozamis" due to its abundancy of Metamphetamine Hydrochloride or commonly called Shabu.

Etymology
The name Malangas got its name from a sitio later named Malangas Gamay, probably of Spanish origin. Though the exact origin of “Malangas” is unclear, the word itself might have Spanish origins, probably taken from the word “Malanga” which means “Taro” (Colocasia Esculenta to Botanists) in English (“Taro” is called “Gabi” in Filipino), as the natives of Malangas might have been planting this crops during the time when the Spaniards paid them a visit.

History
Malangas is one of the oldest municipality of its former province, Zamboanga del Sur. In 1951, the barrios of Malangas, La Dicha, Diplo, Gusem, Buug, Matinaw, Gaulan, Tinungtungan, Manangon, Lindang, Luop, Silupa, Minsulao, Paruk, Lubing, Balabao, Mali, Baluran, Sampuli and Bacao, all from Margosatubig were separated to form the town of Malangas.

A booming coal town during the 1900s, and the mother town of various towns namely Buug, Diplahan, Imelda, part of Siay in Zamboanga Sibugay and the towns of Bayog and Kumalarang in Zamboanga del Sur.

Geography 
The town is Located on the south-eastern tip of Zamboanga Sibugay province. It is bounded on the east by Dumanquilas Bay and south by the Celebes Sea. It is two and a half hours away from Pagadian city, 45 minutes drive from the Provincial capital, and 133 kilometers away from the city of Zamboanga.

Malangas also includes the island of Muyong, having endowed with white sand beaches, and other of uninhabited islands near the shorelines. Mainland area are steeply sloping terrain of hills and mountains. Due to its topography and elevation the town do not experience flooding.

Climate 

The Municipality of Malangas enjoys a location that is free from the typhoon belt area. Average humidity year round is 77%.

Barangays 
Malangas belongs to the 1st District of Zamboanga Sibugay. It is politically subdivided into 25 barangays.

Demographics 

The indigenous people of the area now known as Malangas were the Malangeneous.

The large majority of the population of Malangas is Roman Catholic (87%). Other religions represented are Protestant (3%), and Islam (10%).

Language 
The Main language of Malangas is Bisaya. Locals can also speak well in Tagalog and English. 
English is widely used in education and understood. Other languages of the Philippines are also spoken, mostly between family members, relatives, or neighbors belonging to the same ethnic group. Among these languages, the most spoken include Chavacano languages, Tausug, Maguindanao, and the Subanen.

According to Meranau dialect, Malangas means smiley face.
 Malangas

Economy 

Coal mining has been in operation in Malangas since the early 1930s, which strengthens the local economy as well as that of the entire province Zamboanga Sibugay. In 1938, the Malangas Coal Reservation was established. Although the scale of the present operations is relatively modest, the production is of considerable national significance. There are relatively large deposits of coal and this estimates to contain nearly 10 million tons of coal (according to Frederick L. Wernstedt,Joseph Earle Spencer) some of which is of coking quality - a small quantity to be sure, but one that gains added significance in light of the general overall shortage of mineral fuels in the Philippines. The present production of Malangas coal is being shipped to the Iligan Industrial area.

The rest of Malangas is still heavily dependent on agriculture and aquaculture, while in the coastal areas there is also commercial fishing.

Manufacturing:
 Rice and Corn Milling
 Coffee Milling

Coal mining 
There are Philippine coals which are of such quality that they can be used by current users without the need for any coal preparation or blending with imported coals. Among these are the coal deposits being mined in Malangas. The PNOC (Philippine National Oil Company) and the TMC its Taiwanese partner operates coal within the Malangas Coal Reservation. It also operates a large-scale coal mine known as the Integrated Little Baguio (ILB) colliery, which is currently the largest semi-mechanized underground coal mine in the country.

In the year 1995, a worst tragedy happened when a huge methane gas explosion ripped through a coal mine tunnel in Malangas town, killing more than 100 people. The blast set off a fireball, which swept through nine kilometers of mines, and setting off other explosives which had been stockpiled inside the tunnel. Ten years later, six miners were killed when a coal tunnel collapsed in Diplahan town.

News about the coal mine in Malangas has been rumored that PNOC-EC may sell mine to San Miguel Corp.
According to the news, the Philippine National Oil Company - Exploration Corp. (PNOC-EC) is in talks with diversified conglomerate San Miguel Corp. to sell a coal mine in Mindanao and this is probably in Zamboanga Peninsula where Malangas is located. For 2009, total coal production in Malangas amounted to 91,440 metric tons, a decrease from the 2008 output of 110, 549 metric tons due to major repair and rehabilitation “conducted immediately upon takeover of the mines.” Today, Mining operators are still operating in the coal reservation of the town.

Tourism
Malangas is endowed with several islets that are ideal for resort development. One of these is Isla Muyong, comparable to Boracay Island in Katiklan and Coron palawan . One characteristic that they have in common is their white sand beaches. Others are also sprawled in some of the town's coastline.

The most notable beach in Malangas is the Municipal Government owned beach resort, located in Bunker, the site of the town's coal port. Many people who live in the nearby towns like it because of the proximity of the place.

Government
The local council is administered by the mayor, with the assistance of the vice mayor. There is only one representative Sangguniang Kabataan (Youth Council) and Association of Barangay Captains (ABC).

Malangas has been administered by elected and appointed officials since July 23, 1951, with a strong Mayor-council government. The current mayor is governed by Alfredo A. Atilano, the first male elected mayor in the 21st century in the history of Malangas. The Municipal mayor is restricted to three consecutive terms, totaling nine years, although a mayor can be elected again after an interruption of one term. Marcelo Baquial Jr. is the municipal's incumbent vice mayor. The vice mayor heads the legislative arm composed of the elected Municipal councilors.

Infrastructure

Water Supply 
One of the major problems in Malangas is the water system. Water resources are also less abundant. Almost 90 percent of the population get its water supply from a nearby barangay. But this is not abundant for the population. This explains the water scarcity in the area. While some barangays receive enough water, others experience constant water deficiency most especially in the poblacion area. Lack of access to water is a larger problem in the population anywhere else in the town center. The water supply only runs hourly within the different districts/purok. There are recent government efforts to improve the management of water resources in Malangas but all had failed. As of now, the government is trying to solve the problem to help get the people a good and fine water system.

Education 

Malangas is home to one of the external studies unit of Western Mindanao State University, the state university in western Mindanao region which is ranked sixth among 68 universities all over the country, according to a survey on the Top Academic Institutions in the Philippines conducted by the Commission on Higher Education. Head office of the university is in Zamboanga City The campus is located at the mountain hill of the town viewing the Dumaguillas Bay and neighboring islets.

See also 
 Malangas Coal Reservation
 Malangas Institute

References

External links 
 Malangas Profile at PhilAtlas.com
 [ Philippine Standard Geographic Code]
 Philippine Census Information

Municipalities of Zamboanga Sibugay
Mining communities in the Philippines